Paressisus is a monotypic beetle genus in the family Cerambycidae described by Per Olof Christopher Aurivillius in 1917. Its only species, Paressisus viridipennis, was described by the same author in the same year.

References

Desmiphorini
Beetles described in 1917
Monotypic beetle genera